Mack 10 is the debut solo studio album by American rapper Mack 10. It was released on June 20, 1995 via Priority Records. Production was handled by Ice Cube, 88 X Unit, Dr. Jam, Madness 4 Real, DJ Crazy Toones, and Mack 10 himself. It features guest appearances from K-Dee, Westside Connection and the Mary Jane Girls.

The album peaked at number 33 on the Billboard 200 and went Gold by the Recording Industry Association of America on September 12, 1995.  The song "Foe Life" was used in the 1997 film Anaconda, starring producer Ice Cube.

Track listing

Sample credits
Track 4 contains an interpolation of "Mary Jane" written and performed by Rick James
Track 7 contains a sample from "Remind Me" written and performed by Patrice Rushen
Track 10 contains samples from "Devotion" written by Maurice White & Philip Bailey and performed by Earth, Wind & Fire, and "Flashlight" written by George Clinton, William Collins & Bernie Worrell and performed by Parliament
Track 12 contains a sample from "A.J. Scratch" written and performed by Kurtis Blow
Track 13 contains an interpolation of "Devotion" written by Maurice White & Philip Bailey and performed by Earth, Wind & Fire

Charts

Weekly charts

Year-end charts

Certifications

References

External links

G-funk albums
Mack 10 albums
1995 debut albums
Priority Records albums